Mega64 was a DVD-exclusive series released from 2004 to 2010. The show has a story that is based around the characters playing video games in real life. The "real" video games are usually just the characters out in public acting out the video game.

Version 1

Episode 1: Life Inside A Console
The show begins in the apartment of Dr. Poque, an ex-video game programmer turned mad scientist who claims to have created the "greatest thing to happen to video gaming since Bubble Bobble". He calls it the Mega64, a revolutionary system that uses virtual reality helmets to download any video game into the user's brain and memories. It also plays movies, sends faxes, does advanced probability calculations, and has a spacious storage compartment.

To Poque's great frustration however, he is unable to sell his system to any video game companies, getting the same response from each of them: that tapping into the minds of children is too risky. Desperate for the success of his invention, Poque sought out video game nerds all across the Internet, offering the chance to beta test an innovative new system. Unbeknownst to them, it's all a trap. Poque captures all who show and they are imprisoned in a vast dungeon deep under his apartment complex. Though given food and living quarters, they are forced to undergo his digital experiments day in and day out. Through these experiments, Poque seeks to find the one video game no player wishes to leave, and then unleash it onto the public to gain total world domination.

Though a vast number of subjects endure these experiments, the show follows the day-to-day life of Rocko and Derek, whom Poque seems to show a particular interest in.

Rocko and Derek begin their digital misadventures with Super Mario Bros. and Kid Icarus, before Derek can't take it anymore. Poque, seeing himself as a merciful man, allows Rocko and Derek a break from experiments and they are introduced to one of their fellow subjects, Sean.

Sean is in charge of delivering Rocko and Derek e-mail from other test subjects like them. The concept of Sean's job is really only used as a method of introducing the character, and after the first episode, Rocko and Derek seldom answer any other e-mails.

Sean presents himself as a sort of awkwardly psychotic individual. Immediately after his introduction Sean becomes one of the show's less explained enigmas, at least for now.
Rocko and Derek go on to test an additional game, this one created specifically for the Mega64 by an independent company called Suxxor Games. The game XXX, Y takes an extreme and/or totally radical approach to graphing, and then by suggestion of Rocko, the two delve into the world of Banjo Kazooie. Rocko realizes that some positive can come out of their fate to test the Mega64, and that someday they will defeat Poque, because good always overcomes evil.
The episode ends with a confusing epilogue by a Sombrero Guy, and when Rocko asks, "Um, who are you?" the man just takes his hat off and gloomily walks away.

Episode 2: I Feel Asleep
The episode starts with a conversation between Derek and Rocko where Rocko draws a picture of his girlfriend for Derek and the two find a bloody knife on the floor which is never explained.

After Dr. Poque puts up a "BRB" sign, Marcus is introduced to the show. Marcus is a puppet and also Dr. Poque's assistant. He refers to almost everyone as "son" and has an extremely deep voice. The scene ends with Rocko and Derek beating up Marcus.

After a session of Punch-Out!!, it is revealed that the food supply has been cut off from the dungeon. Marcus shows up and reveals that he knows how to find out what's wrong, by logging into  Dr. Poque's camera network setup. Marcus gives them the password, which is Dr. Poque's first name. We do not hear it, but Rocko says it sounds like "some kind of butt disease." They manage to get the camera working again, only to see Dr. Poque's hispanic roommate, Horatio. Horatio always wears a hat, a blue jogging suit, and dark sunglasses. He is constantly annoying and stealing from Dr. Poque.

Horatio reveals that he accidentally opened a spam e-mail that downloaded a virus to the central computer which is cutting off the food supply. Rocko volunteers to go into the Mega64 to terminate the virus. Rocko ends up getting captured by the virus, and Dr. Poque downloads a codec to erase the virus, but he can't find it. So Derek goes into Metal Gear Solid as Solid Snake in order to sneak his way around a grocery store and find the codec. However, as Snake, Derek is too obsessed with instead locating and destroying Metal Gear than finding the codec, and fails the mission.  Sean then goes into the game as Raiden and finds the codec, thus returning the virus to its human form.

Episode 3: Poque

The episode starts with a mysterious figure explaining his hatred for Dr. Poque. It goes into a Shenmue skit, then Derek and Rocko reveal that there is a big invention Dr. Poque's been waiting to show them. As Dr. Poque is telling them about it, he gets a mysterious message from a hacker. He passes on the new project to Marcus.

Marcus reveals that the new invention is a multiplayer add-on. Derek and Rocko go into a game of Super Dodge Ball with other Mega64 gamers. After the game, Derek and Rocko get a mysterious call from a man calling himself Tony telling them to "Eat at Joe's." After telling him he has the wrong number, he screams and hangs up.

Meanwhile, back at the hideout... Dr. Poque figures out that the hacker got in through the new network adapter they installed. Dr. Poque gets Horatio to go set up a firewall. The hacker then reveals himself to Dr. Poque as "tr1gg3r s3r1ou5!!!!1" (his real name is Rion Specter). He insults the Mega64, saying that all console games are inferior to PC games. After revealing that he's never heard of the Dreamcast, Dr. Poque insists on giving him a lesson through a music video, "Nuttin' But A Dreamcast", a parody of Dr. Dre's "Nuthin' But a "G" Thang".  The video is concluded with a guest-appearance by Hunkty Krunkty, a fictional rapper in the Mega64 Universe.

After the music video, the hacker tells Dr. Poque that he hacked the Mega64 and that when Derek and Rocko go into it next, he's going to kill them. He loads up Duke Nukem Forever with God mode in order to kill them. But at the last second, Dr. Poque breaks back in and loads the hacker, Derek and Rocko into Street Fighter II, in which Derek and Rocko beat up Rion, and he is left trapped in the game, seemingly forgotten about.

Horatio comes back saying he put the firewall up, and that Dr. Poque might need a new car, never explaining what happened to the car. Sean then comes in and asks if Derek and Rocko got a phone call, they say that some guy called telling them to "eat at Joe's, and his name was Tony." Sean suddenly has a flashback where Tony comes into his house and kills his girlfriend because he didn't eat at Joe's, threatening to "kill all the people he loves."

Episode 4: The Gangs Returned To Class And Became Honor Students
The episode starts out with a rainy nighttime sequence where Horatio is dragging some heavy bags around a house. It is unexplained for now.

Three days earlier, Dr. Poque gets an e-mail from a "big gaming company that has much interest in his product." After a Tetris game, Derek and Rocko get pranked by Horatio. Sean hears the word "prank" and rushes in, Horatio and Sean argue about who is the better prankster, Sean eventually leaves, warning them of "Sean's Prank Assault."

Dr. Poque then tells the crew that he got an e-mail saying a representative from a big video game company is coming in three days to take a tour of his console testing lair and preview the Mega64. Horatio brings out a muffin to give to Dr. Poque to celebrate, but there is a razor blade in it, revealing it to be a prank. Dr. Poque recovers from this incident and starts preparing for their visitor. He tells Derek and Rocko to "watch a movie" to kill some time. They are shown a trailer of Super Mario Bros. the Movie 2: Bloodlust, a fictional movie.

Dr. Poque realizes that the apartment is extremely messy and suspicious. He asks Horatio to clean it up, and decides that if the representative gets too suspicious, Horatio is going to kill the representative off when he hears the code word "Delaware". He then asks Derek and Rocko to come up with a game where there's a peaceful community, to show off the Mega64's capabilities. Derek suggests River City Ransom and they are loaded into the game.

When they exit the game, their faces have sharpie on them, another prank by Horatio. Dr. Poque walks back into his room to find mousetraps everywhere, which he quickly gets injured by. Rocko then does another session of Shenmue. Dr. Poque then decides, because he is covered in bandages, to get someone who looks like him to pretend to be him. Despite Rocko's obvious resemblance, he chooses Marcus.

Dr. Poque is about to train Marcus in how to act like him when the representative, Rick, shows up. Confused, Dr. Poque learns that Horatio has been putting sleeping pills into his drinks and turning all the clocks backwards, so while Dr. Poque thinks it's been one day, it's really already been three, revealing yet another prank.

Marcus, posing as Dr. Poque, gives Rick a tour of the apartment after they watch a Mega64 Console Commercial and another commercial for the Mega64 version of Soul Calibur II, with a new hidden character, Star Wars Kid.

After Rick says he needs to talk the offer over with his associates in Delaware, Horatio bursts out of a pile of dirty laundry and beats him to death with a hammer. He leaves to get a buzzsaw and some trash bags, thus explaining the beginning of the episode. Sean comes in laughing saying that he pranked Dr. Poque, that Rick was actually his brother and he made up the whole e-mail and big video game company in order to get the location of the Compound. Sean then realizes that his brother has been killed and the episode ends with him crying and screaming.

Episode 5: Eyes of Skull Has A Secret
The episode starts with Sean and a mysterious masked man (called The Specter) having a conversation in an unspecified dining room. The Specter tells Sean that he can change his fate, then he suddenly is awoken by Rocko and Derek, revealing the sequence to possibly be a dream. Sean starts telling Rocko and Derek about the dream but they're uninterested so Sean hides behind the Mega64 to sulk.

As Rocko and Derek are about to load WarioWare, Sean comes in with a pizza and a soda, trying to prove that he is fun. He then throws the soda at the Mega64, causing it to fry while Derek and Rocko are connected. Dr. Poque angrily tells Sean to leave the project for good. Dr. Poque is about to unplug them when he sees readings he's never seen before, saying that they're "merging with the programming." He insists on leaving them connected for the sake of science, while Horatio leaves and tries to come up with a way to stop Poque.

Dr. Poque sees that Rocko and Derek's minds are projecting "gibberish." Among this gibberish is a trailer for a fictional video game called Aggressive Caroling, a fictional PSA for Rabies, and a skit for Frogger.

Meanwhile, Horatio figures out that if they blow up the Core of the Mega64 then the system will reset back to zero. He calls Sean to ask him to go inside and hit the Core. Sean is walking through the tunnels beneath Dr. Poque's apartment. He is sitting in a corner sulking when Marcus shows up and comforts him. Marcus leaves and The Specter shows up. He hands Sean a gold helmet so he can enter the Mega64.

As he hands him the helmet, the power in the compound goes out and Sean is loaded into The Legend of Zelda as Link. Sean's signal is "the most powerful energy signal ever detected inside the Mega64." As Link, Sean finds the Core, and despite being shot by Dr. Poque, who goes into the Mega64 to stop Sean, he manages to destroy the Core.

After the Mega64 resets, Derek and Rocko find themselves in the dining room that Sean and The Specter were in earlier. Dr. Poque is there too, and before performing a system reset that sends them back into the Dungeon, he says "You weren't supposed to find out about this place."

Derek and Rocko come out of the Mega64 in the Dungeon and decide that Dr. Poque must be connected to the Mega64 somehow and they intend to find out so they can find a way out of there. They realize that Sean isn't there, and Sean is shown walking down an unknown road, still dressed as Link.

Several days later... all seems to be okay with Derek and Rocko. Meanwhile, Dr. Poque goes to meet with two mysterious men, Kain and Wanser. It is suggested that they are representatives from a company that Dr. Poque is working for. They state that "the council" is "less than pleased" with his progress. Dr. Poque apologizes and promises he won't make the same mistakes again. As Poque is walking away, his internal monologue is interrupted by the Sombrero Guy. Dr. Poque yells at him and he walks away dejected.

Mega64 is a DVD-exclusive series that can be only purchased on their website. The show has a story that is based around the characters playing video games in real life. The "real" video games are usually just the characters out in public acting out the video game. This is a summary of the second DVD, entitled "Mega64: Version 2". For a list of the skits on the show, see the List of Mega64 skits.

Version 2

Episode 1: This Story Is Happy End

The episode starts with a young girl watching TV after she's returned from school. She sees the intro to Episode 1 from Version 1 on her TV and is very disgusted. It then goes into a Super Mario Bros. 2 skit.

A scene later, Dr. Poque returns home to find more bills in the mail. He asks Horatio for a solution, and Horatio puts the bills with a box full of others that he's been putting away. Dr. Poque asks why they have no money, and they go through a list of games they've developed that aren't selling. (See the skit list) Horatio suggests they just steal the money, citing his friend Carlos who is now in prison. Dr. Poque comes up with the idea to create a video to help rehabilitate prisoners.

Derek and Rocko are having a discussion about how they've been trapped for six months and how every attempt to escape has failed when Sean shows up with no explanation about how he got out of the Mega64. Rocko suggests they look for clues in another game while he looks for a way to escape, so Derek and Sean load up Hitman.

Meanwhile, Dr. Poque finishes his program to make prisoners docile. He recruits Marcus to deliver the program to the Mega64, and warns him not to watch it, but he does anyway. After deciding that it's crap, he "fixes it" and turns it into an extremely violent video which Derek views, making him extremely aggressive and violent. After threatening to kill Rocco in various ways, Rocco moves in with Sean.

Sean lives in an all white room with a file cabinet, a broken alarm clock, two chairs, and a picture of two clowns. To make the situation less awkward, Rocco and Sean load up Ghosts 'n Goblins. Dr. Poque then discovers that Marcus tampered with his program, he instructs Horatio to "take Marcus out." Misinterpreting this, Horatio takes Marcus out for the day.

Meanwhile, Rocko wakes up to find Sean staring at him, because Sean doesn't sleep. He runs away to the Mega64, where Dr. Poque has just convinced Derek to use a program that has much "blood and guts," but really it is the original program that Dr. Poque hopes will make Derek go back to normal. Hearing Dr. Poque, and thinking the program really is violent, Rocko goes into the program as well. The program has no effect on Derek, and ends up making Rocko extremely wimpy.

Dr. Poque then decides that he can use video games to make Rocko and Derek go back to normal. He loads Derek into Mappy-Land in order to make him happier, which he quickly rejects. Dr. Poque then loads Rocko into Grand Theft Auto in order to toughen him up, which similarly has no effect. Dr. Poque is out of ideas when Sean comes in with a program he wrote. It is extremely creepy and it snaps Rocko and Derek back to normal. The episode ends with a tribute to Michael Jackson's Thriller.

Episode 2: Ode To Sue

The episode starts with Horatio playing Xbox in Dr. Poque's room. Dr. Poque says that "between yelling at your game here and talking to your little internet girlfriend, it's getting pretty annoying". Without Poque realizing, Horatio steals a $20 bill out of Poque's pocket. Horatio then challenges Poque to a $20 bet to get a girl in the apartment by the end of the day.

After a session of Dig Dug, Derek gets the idea to dig their way out of the dungeon while Dr. Poque is busy with his date with the girl he met on the internet. Rocko asks him how they'll escape once they're out, and Derek reveals he has the keys to Dr. Poque's truck, which Horatio flushed down the toilet when Poque ate his Pop-Tarts.

While Dr. Poque gets ready for his date, Marcus and Horatio go to Sidne's house and bring her and her friends over to the apartment. That night, Dr. Poque's date, Sue arrives. When Poque goes to get the dinner he prepared, it is gone. Horatio and his friends admit to eating it, and Dr. Poque warns them not to mess with him for the rest of the night.

Poque goes back to Sue with Hot Pockets and Sue asks who Rocko and Derek are. Dr. Poque plays dumb and then asks them to put on a show for him and Sue. They load up Resident Evil.

The awkward date continues, with Poque and Sue being interrupted and annoyed by Horatio, Marcus, and their friends, until finally Poque freaks out and introduces Sue to his roommates, "the world's stupidest peon over here in blue... and the world's most retarded puppet." Marcus comes in with a "Hey, son!" and Sue is instantly attracted to him and they run off together.

The next day, Marcus and Sue come back from their date and Poque leaves the apartment angry. Thinking Poque is gone, Rocko decides they should keep digging their way out. As he leaves to get the wooden swordfish to dig their way out, Dr. Poque comes down to the dungeon for the first time and forces Derek to cheer him up by playing Luigi's Mansion. It fails to cheer up Dr. Poque, and Derek inspires him to go win Sue back.

Dr. Poque comes back to Sue with a poorly edited music video of him dancing on the beach to the song "Please Let Me Die (I Want To Die)" by TIM (Spoof of the Finnish rock band HIM, complete with spoof heartagram.) Afterwards, Sue gets disgusted when Marcus and Poque begin fighting over her and she storms out of the apartment. Derek and Rocko manage to dig out of the dungeon right as Dr. Poque leaves to chase after Sue. Sue stands in the road while Poque tries to get her to come back. Right when it seems like she is going to give Poque another chance, Derek and Rocko hit her with Dr. Poque's truck, thus, killing her. They step out of the truck in shock and put themselves back in the dungeon. Sean then jumps out of the back of the truck, runs away yelling "Oh, shit, Not again! No!" and jumps in the bushes far away.

Episode 3: And Suddenly, Ezra Didn't Feel So Alone Anymore

The episode starts with a "dude from the future" arriving in front of the Mega64 only to find no one there, so he leaves. Derek and Rocko walk in and sit down as a smaller screen appears in the bottom right corner of the screen. During the intro song, a young man named Benny sits down in front of the smaller screen and starts singing along to the song.

After the intro, Rocko and Derek go into a session of Donkey Konga. Rocko asks who Benny is, and Benny says he lives in the same apartment complex just a few doors down. Dr. Poque tells them to ignore him. Rocko insists on knowing how Benny got there, and Benny explains that he got a new webcam and when he went to the bathroom there was a power surge and when he returned his webcam signal was in their apartment/dungeon. The power surge was caused by the Future Dude coming back in the beginning of the episode.

Dr. Poque then explains that the Mega64 isn't selling because it's not sleek and portable. To fix this, he has come up with the MSFP (Mega64 Portable). He orders Rocko and Derek to build them. Meanwhile, Dr. Poque will hack his way into a public-access television cable TV station so they can air an MSFP special. Rocko comes up with a plan to load the MSFP with maps so whoever purchases it can find them and help them escape.

Later on, the crew is on public-access television airing the MSFP special. After a clip of California Games, the commercial shows off the various uses and portability of the MSFP. The only caller they get is Benny, so Horatio decides to get his mom to buy one since it is Dr. Poque's birthday. As the crew goes off the air, Benny tells Poque about Rocko and Derek's escape plan, thus ruining it.

As Rocko and Derek are sulking, Sean comes in and tells them he created a video with their location and included it in the MSFP, but because of his incompetence he screws it up, and the MSFP ends up slicing off Horatio's mom's hand. Horatio and his mom say they'll sue Dr. Poque for $2 million if he doesn't get her a new hand.

After a session of BurgerTime, Dr. Poque reveals that he's going to give Horatio's mom a robot, called 2Poque, to help her out instead of a new hand. The robot ends up cutting her other hand off, and she insists on getting $4 million or two new hands. Marcus finally shows up and Benny instantly begins making fun of him. Marcus disappears and then reappears on Benny's smaller screen. He cuts Benny's hands off and then the smaller screen goes blank. Dr. Poque then offers Horatio's mom Benny's hands, and she accepts the offer.

Rocko then asks what happened to the extra MSFPs they made, and Sean says he buried them. 1,000 years later, the Future Dude and a gorilla with wings named Ezra find an MSFP and the Future Dude goes back to when the message was recorded to save them, thus explaining the beginning of the episode.

Episode 4: What The Hell Happened To Mega64?

The episode starts with a session of Paperboy. Afterwards, Dr. Poque calls the whole crew together with his new meeting alarm. He informs them that Teddy Beans, an old college rival of his, is coming to the apartment. He gets all of them to pretend to be his business partners and when Teddy Beans show up he is given a quick tour of the apartment when suddenly a group of masked men rush into the apartment with guns drawn.

The head terrorist, Danny America, an older man with an eyepatch and a Russian accent, walks in and demands that Poque hand over $300,000. Teddy Beans says that there is no way he has that much and makes fun of Dr. Poque. Danny America laughs along with him and then suddenly shoots Teddy in the head, killing him. Before being taken away by the terrorists, Dr. Poque sends a fax down to the dungeon stating that he is in trouble, has opened the holding chamber, and that the terrorists are coming after them next.

The group leaves the dungeon and splits up, Derek goes off on his own and is quickly captured, while Sean and Rocko go off in another direction. Rocko goes off to steal a car so they can rescue Derek while Sean waits. Meanwhile, at the terrorist's hideout, Marcus and Horatio are put under the watchful eye of Danny America's first lieutenant and sister, Gruntilda. Meanwhile, Danny America continually interrogates Dr. Poque about the whereabouts of the $300,000, which Poque keeps insisting he doesn't have. In order to show him how poor he is, he shows him a video of his work on his PSP, which is an Ico skit.

Derek is brought into the terrorist's camp, and is put in the boiler room with Dr. Poque. Danny America decides to put Lobo Fuerte in charge of capturing Sean and Rocko. He is a mysterious man in a gas mask holding a briefcase. Meanwhile, Sean beats up a group of thugs while waiting for Rocko. Rocko finally shows up in a stolen car and they start driving. They are quickly chased down, captured and brought to the terrorist camp.

Danny America brings Poque back out to interrogate him further. He then reveals that his plan is to buy 10,000 stuffed parrots for $30 each and sell them on the internet for $200 in order to make huge profits. One of the terrorists tells Danny that they've found information leading to a duffel bag containing $300,000. Dr. Poque is taken back to the boiler room.

The episode then takes a "commercial break" containing a parody commercial for Internet2. When the show comes back, Sean and Rocko kill their captors and take their guns. Sean enters the room with Gruntilda, Marcus, and Horatio, and Marcus kills Gruntilda while she is distracted. As they are leaving, Sean runs into Lobo Fuerte and they both pour gasoline on their bodies, tie their wrists together with a long piece of rope, and fight with lighters.

Meanwhile, Rocko manages to get himself captured as well. But then the terrorists bring in the duffel  bag, which contains a 2Poque robot. It quickly kills all of the terrorists. Meanwhile, just when it appears Lobo Fuerte is going to win the fight, Sean knocks him down, cuts the rope, then lights him on fire. Derek and Dr. Poque come out to see that everyone is dead. Then suddenly, Teddy Beans comes in with a gun drawn, revealing he faked his death and he masterminded the entire thing. Teddy says "So long, Dr. Diarrhea Poque" (revealing Dr. Poque's first name) before getting shot by the Sombrero Guy. When Derek asks who he is, he vanishes like magic.

Episode 5: Summer Semester

The episode begins with Poque watching a news story about opossums popping up due to electrical storms when he sees Horatio walk past his door while carrying a drum. Poque decides to investigate and finds Horatio with the drum and a suspended cymbal and Marcus at a keyboard trying to form a band. Poque doesn't want them to play because he's "extremely jumpy" around loud noises. Horatio promises to not make much noise and starts drumming with his fingers quietly and slowly. Poque agrees to that and walks back to his room where the finger drumming is still audible. He then uses a pair of scissors to trim his eyelashes, a retractable blade to trim his beard, and a knife to remove a bit of food stuck between his teeth. He then grabs a mug and starts to take a sip when Horatio bangs the cymbal and starts drumming loudly, causing Poque to spill his beverage on himself. He then yells to him about playing that loudly while he was drinking "an ice-cold coca-cola beverage" was the worst time to do so and calls him dumb.

After a Katamari Damacy skit, we see Sean and Rocko at the Mega64, where Rocko explains that Poque forced them back into the dungeon after the events of the last episode. Rocko then asks Sean if he's had trouble remembering anything lately. Rocko reveals that he's had difficulty remembering small details like "my old address or a lot of phone numbers I used to know." Sean then says that he has it worse because he doesn't remember anything besides working for Poque, not even how he came to work for him.

We then cut to Horatio's room where he and Marcus are jamming loudly just as Poque storms into the room demanding that they stop. Horatio then asks if he'd like to join their band, which they named Mega64. We then cut to Poque incompetently playing a guitar with Horatio and Marcus and then another cut is made to Poque's room where we find that Horatio and Marcus are kicking him out of the band. Poque says that he's taking the name Mega64 with him and Horatio says that's fine and renames his band to Summer Semester.

Meanwhile, Rocko is standing next to the Mega64 when Derek walks in with the disk containing Sean's behavioral modification program. Derek reveals that he's been studying it and found something hidden at the end. Derek loads the program for Rocko who watches the end of it. After it fades to white it does nothing for a while before slightly fading in on The Specter. He slowly whispers "Sean. Bring me Sean." Rocko takes off his helmet and is noticeably disturbed by what he saw. Rocko and Derek decide that they need to get Sean to see it and walk off to find him.

Poque is in his room playing his guitar when Horatio and Marcus burst in announcing that "a strange looking guy with a red face" from a record label wants them to record an album and that one of their songs is capable of killing opossums. They gloat about it for a while and then leave.

Rocko and Derek bring Sean to the Mega64 so they can show him The Specter in his program. Sean puts on his helmet while Derek loads the program. However, instead of The Specter, Sean sees a series of images that quickly flash before him while a screeching noise plays. Sean then faints and falls off the chair.

Later at night, Poque is in his room sleeping while a figure watches him. Poque wakes up and then screams when he sees the figure and the figure hisses back at him. Poque turns the light on to reveal that the figure has gray skin, some fur under his neck and a black nose. Poque demands to know who he is and the figure replies that his name is Thark and he wants to see "the creator of Mega64."

Back in the dungeon, Rocko and Derek are trying to wake Sean up. Derek manages to slap him awake and they ask him what he saw. Sean says that he doesn't remember what happened to him after he put his helmet on. To apologize for slapping him in the face, Rocko and Derek go off to find a drink for Sean. After they leave, we find that Sean does remember what happened and he leaves to investigate.

We come back to Poque and Thark and find that Thark meant he wanted to see the Horatio and Marcus of the band Mega64. He then tells Poque that he's a man-opossum from fifty years in the future. Horatio and Marcus' opossum killing song forced opossums to evolve to a point where they gained psychic abilities and enslaved humanity. However, another one of their songs had the same effect on snakes and the two species had a "manimal" war which the man-opossums lost. They then built a time machine to go back in time to stop the creation of the snake song. Poque tells Thark where the album is being recorded and they rush over.

Sean is walking through the corridors underneath the dungeon and we see that they correspond with they the images that Sean saw. He is about to walk in a door when we cut back to Thark and Poque at the recording studio where we find that Horatio and Marcus have already made the album and that they know about the manimal war because their contact from the record label is Jessse, a man-snake. Horatio decides that they should have a battle of the bands to settle the war. Both sides agree to it and they leave to prepare.

Sean is looking in the room from the images when he comes upon a box. After a Seaman skit, Sean enters the Mega64 room with some papers which turn out to be blueprints to the Mega64. Rocko notices that Sean's name is mentioned on the blueprints several times and Derek finds a disk for the Mega64. They load it up and put on their helmets to watch it. The program starts off with a black screen playing ominous piano music. The word "FALZ" fades in followed by "PROJECT MEGA64" and then followed by "TEST DATA ALPHA STAGE." The program then shuts off because Poque has rerouted as much power as he can to power his "new kickass amp." There's still enough power left to play Altered Beast so Poque loads it up.

After the skit, Poque and Thark meet up with Horatio, Marcus and Jessse at a beach for the battle. Poque and Thark go first and Horatio, Marcus and Jessse go next. After they play, Poque has Rocko, Derek and Sean decide the winner. They pick Jessse's song as the winner and then Rocko points out if they destroy the master copy of the album then neither side will come into existence. Horatio then scratches it with sand and Thark and Jessse pop out of existence. Poque then asks Rocko, Derek and Sean if they were running a program when he rerouted the power because the Mega64 destroys anything loaded in it if it shuts down while running a program.

Episode 6: Stranger

The episode starts with a Resident Evil 4 skit in which the characters get arrested. Rocko then drinks out of a cup that has an offensive saying on it, Derek explains that Marcus is trying to sell cups to gourmet restaurants as "conversation starters." Then, a new character named Jon rides his bike by and talks to Rocko and Derek.

After a session of Feel the Magic: XY/XX, Sean and Jon leave to check out Sean's room. Rocko questions the fact that they haven't seen Dr. Poque in days and that Jon showed up out of nowhere and Derek gets mad at him for assuming everyone is out to get him.

Upstairs, Horatio and Marcus are discussing Marcus's cups and the new guy, Jon. We then see Dr. Poque  sitting in a bathtub and putting on a helmet. This is when he experiences his flashbacks.

Back in Sean's room, Jon tells him that there is someone who haunts the Mega64. He died while connected to it because of the "age-limit bug." Jon explains that it was dangerous for anyone too old to use the Mega64. It's been fixed since, but Jon says FALZ still only lets teenagers beta test it. He explains that FALZ is the team that really invented the Mega64. He said that they only use Poque because of his connections and that the man who haunts the Mega64 can travel between the Mega64 and the real world, and bring things back with him. Seans says that he has met this man, and after an awkward silence Sean puts on his helmet to play a game.

Meanwhile, Derek and Rocko play a game of A Boy and His Blob: Trouble on Blobolonia. When Derek gets out, he yells at Rocko for not being the blob, but Rocko is behind the Mega64 trying to fix it. Jon walks in and tells Derek not to play discs that don't belong to him. When Derek is bent down, he knocks Derek out and says that he'll never stop FALZ and that "the only threat to FALZ is Sean, and I've already taken care of him." Jon drags Derek out and Rocko has seen the whole thing.

We then see the television show Judgemental Night (Parody of Judgement Day) interrupted by a U62 news update that says that televisions in the city are being interrupted by a pirate signal showing Derek and Rocko using the Mega64. The news story shows that Mega64 has gotten a fan base who have conventions, make skit suggestions and make songs about Mega64. Kevin Smith is apparently interested in directing the movie. Other members of the fanbase include Paul Farkas, Ricky "Thumbs" Jackson, Tim Heidecker, and Eric Wareheim.

After the news broadcast, Marcus goes down the dungeon and Rocko tells him that Jon is trying to overthrow the place. Marcus vows to take out Jon and connects himself to the Mega64 to get into Street Fighter II while Rocko goes to rescue Sean. Marcus recruits tr1gg3r s3r1ou5!!!!1, who has been stuck in the game since the last time they encountered him, to help them stop Jon. Marcus gets to him agree to help stop Jon by hacking the Mega64 after Marcus says he'll get him out of the Mega64 and help him find Poque.

Meanwhile, Rocko finds Sean on the floor in Jon's room and then Jon comes in hits Rocko in the knee with a wrench and then puts on a Mega64 helmet to get the secret thoughts he drained out of Sean's brain. When he puts it on, he gets hacked by tr1gg3r s3r1ou5!!!!1 and he sees random images, including an Aggressive Caroling skit and another Legend of Zelda skit. When he takes off the helmet, Marcus attacks him, but then Jon rips the puppet apart, seemingly killing him.

Jon and Sean then run up to the apartment. Horatio then walks into Jon's room and sees Marcus on the floor torn in pieces. Jon starts typing on Dr. Poque's computer to gas the whole place and kill everyone when the power goes out and Horatio comes in and beats up Jon in a fit of rage. As Jon gets up, Dr. Poque shoots him and kills him.

Later, everyone is hanging out and having a good time, Horatio has even taped up and fixed Marcus, Trigger Serious has finally come out of the Mega64, and Sean says that he's gonna go find FALZ and find out who really made the Mega64. Suddenly, just as Dr. Poque is about to say what he learned that day, a giant evil rabbit in a Santa Claus costume, known as "frankie.jpg", bursts into his room punches Horatio in the face, knocks over Marcus who is yelling "Help me!" and attacks Dr. Poque who is left screaming "it's loose!"

Flashbacks

The episode also explains more of Dr. Poque's past through flashbacks. The first one shows Poque three years ago applying for a job with SharnoTech developing video games. He runs into his friend Gary who set him up with the interview and explains that he got the job. A while later, he is on the phone with his girlfriend explaining that he is doing well at his job and might get to show some of his work to Brion Specter. They get in an argument about his arrogance and he hangs up on her. While lying on the couch he sees a laser pointer light on his wall and looks outside but there is no one there.

Then, two years later, Poque is at work goofing off. His co-workers ask why he has been doing other stuff instead of making the games he is supposed to make. He ignores them and then his boss shows up upset. That night, he sees the red light again and goes out to the street and sees Kain who claims to be from FALZ. Kain tells him he is brilliant and that they need Poque to develop something new. He tells Poque to meet him the next night and Poque goes to the location and when he arrives there are many people dressed in the same way present-Poque dresses and they welcome him to FALZ.

Then, one year later, in a board meeting, he is showing off the Mega64 to his co-workers who look disturbed at the idea. Dr. Poque is then leaving, apparently having been fired. Poque's co-worker tells him that Brian Specter's son has been crying in the lobby all day because his dad didn't show up last night. And the last time anyone saw Brian, he was using the Mega64. This reveals that tr1gg3r s3r1ou5!!!!1 is the son of Brion Specter, who is the man who haunts the Mega64, and explains why his son is out to get revenge on Poque.

More flashbacks show Horatio kidnapping Rocko and Derek, and Dr. Poque putting on his FALZ uniform and being informed that in one year someone (Jon) will be sent to check on his progress.

Version 3

Frankie 
Version 3 begins how Version 2 ended, with Frankie bursting into Poque's room, he jumps on Poque, who fends him off with a Guitar Hero controller, Frankie eats Marcus and is then wounded by 2 gunshots fired by a hunter, Ted Geisel (Scott Kelso), Frankie attacks Ted, ripping of his right arm and fleeing.

After the Super Mario Bros. 3 skit, Rocko and Derek awake from the Mega 64 to find with them in the Dungeon is Nicole, a very enthusiastic and easily excited 14-year-old girl who is the daughter of Ted the Hunter.
Upstairs, Dr. Poque reveals that Frankie (Michael J. Nelson) used to be a mall Santa and was going to be the original test subject for the Mega 64, Poque and Horatio kidnapped him and brought him the testing Dungeon but after he started to eat his own poop, strange things started to happen which lead to him transforming from human into a giant rabbit, Ted decided the best course of action is to trap him using the bathroom.

In the Dungeon, Nicole has explained about Frankie and Derek leaves to tell Sean, leaving Rocko and Nicole alone, after an awkward silence they get talking and Rocko tells a story about how he made a bet with Derek for his package of  food, as Rocko is talking about his package Derek walks back in and gets the wrong end of the stick, after the abrupt ending to his story Rocko shows Nicole the Dead Rising skit.
After the skit, Derek and Sean both want a private word with Rocko, after Nicole leaves, Derek confronts Rocko about his 'sexual advances' on Nicole and remind him that Nicole is a minor.

Upstairs, Ted takes advantage of Frankie's apparent fondness for eating poop by using his own poop for bait for a trap, but after Ted sets the bait, he realizes he's out of toilet paper, he walks to Poque's other bathroom where he finds toilet paper and Frankie who attacks and kills Ted, Frankie then goes back to Poque's room to attack Horatio and Poque.

In the Dungeon, Rocko wakes up from playing Skate or Die and wonders where Nicole is, shes in the other room and says she'll be in in a moment, but Rocko is met by Sean in a blazer who asks Rocko to sit down, he is then presented with transcripts of chat logs in a parody of To Catch a Predator, Rocko says he's done nothing wrong, Derek comes in and directly accuses Rocko of doing 'sexy stuff' with Nicole, Rocko strongly denies the accusations and says that his relationship with Nicole is innocent and that the reason he's taken a shine to her is because she is a new face in the dungeon, After Derek and Sean are convinced that Rocko isn't partaking in an illicit affair with a minor, all 3 of them decide to hang out with Nicole.
In the next room where Nicole is, she is in a sexual pose and asks when they are going to do her, Rocko, Derek and Sean kick her out of the Dungeon immediately.

Meanwhile, back in Poque's room, Frankie is attacking Poque and Horatio, as Frankie is about to defeat them, he suddenly and frantically starts grabbing at his chest, he falls to his knees as Marcus bursts out of his chest covered in blood, Frankie drops dead as Horatio and Poque look on in disbelief.

Bigger Boat
After playing Final Fantasy XII on the Mega 64, Sean vows not to play any games with sexy costumes for the rest of the week; however, Dr Poque has a new idea to sell more Mega 64 systems, Sexy 64 an all-male gaming league that will give the Mega 64 a more sexy image, Poque uploads a program that lets the Rocko, Derek and Sean take sexy pictures for a calendar, they go along with it hopeful to hide messages of their captivity in the calendars.

Back upstairs Poque is concerned with the whereabouts of Horatio, Marcus informs him that he left after winning $10,000 on a scratch card and then relays a lengthy and insulting message that Horatio left for Poque.
During Marcus's delivery of Horatio's message, Horatio himself calls up Poque and informs him that he bought a boat for $10,000 from Gregzlist.com and that it should have been delivered to the apartment already, Poque goes outside with Horatio still on the phone, the boat has arrived much to the dismay of Poque, he asks Horatio what kind of boat he ordered, he says that they had the big boat but he bought the Bigger Boat, which says 'BIGGER' on the back; however, the boat outside Poque's house says the N word instead of 'Bigger'. Horatio doesn't believe Poque and says that if his boat truly has the N word on it, he'll eat his hat.

While Dr Poque asks Rocko, Derek and Sean to crack on with Sexy 64, while he figures out how to deal with the boat, he tries to tow the boat with his car, but as he attaches the rope, he is shot at by a ranting Patriot (Dallas McLaughlin) who tells Poque he is protecting the freedom of speech by keeping the boat there at all costs, Poque tries to compromise by just painting over the N word; however, the Patriot shoots the brush from his hands and then vomits.

In the Dungeon Rocko and Derek play NBA Jam to pass time while their Sexy 64 photos are printed; however, Derek finds a photo they didn't take of Rocko and Derek standing over the grave of 'Poque 1029-3454', Rocko suspects that The Specter may have given them this information and Sean identifies that it's not a date on the grave but a frequency, Sean punches in the feqency while Derek and Rocko strap into the Mega 64.

Rocko and Derek are shown a mysterious title screen for 'Down' and are transported to an unknown realm within the Mega 64, they soon meet a cloaked man with white skin and an horrendous grin, he speaks to Rocko and Derek in an unknown language (with English subtitles) asking nonsensical questions, though he does notice that Rocko and Derek are confused by the situation, before any sense could be made of what was happening, Dr Poque cuts the power to the Mega 64 and says he need there help.

He needs Rocko, Sean and Derek to dance in front of the boat as a distraction so that he and Marcus can sneak up on the Patriot and disarm him, Poque also introduces shock collars for them so that they don't attempt an escape.
Outside armed with three Sexy 64 shirts and a boom box, Rocko, Derek and Sean dance for the Patriot, who is now showing physical signs of a decline in health.

During the dance the Patriot starts vomiting blood and collapses on the floor, Derek, Rocko and Sean try to help him but get shocked by the collars, the Patriot continues to sputter up blood and ends his life by shooting himself with his rifle, soon after his death, a Medical agent(Kevin Bushong) shows up and explains that the boat is filled with rats infected with bubonic plague and that he'd have to take away the boat and the plague infected body of the Patriot. Poque realizes the irony of the situation when he finds that the bubonic plague, also known as the "black plague", is linked to a boat with the N word inscribed on it.
As the boat is towed away, Horatio returns wearing a pizza hat and after Poque confirms that the boat said the N word, he grabs a slice of pizza from the hat and is attacked by a pizza hungry Marcus.

The Wizard II
The episode opens with Horatio answering a call from a FALZ Agent (Brad Davis) who wishes to talk to Dr Poque, Horatio says that he'll tell Poque that he called and hangs up, he then tries to locate the origin of a bad smell that's fills the apartment, he is soon joined by Poque who is also looking for the origin of the bad smell, they are interrupted by a knock on the door from Sean Legerton(Sean Legerton) who asks if this is the wizard's house, a confused Poque says no, closes the door and continues looking for the source of the bad smell with Horatio and Marcus, They find that the origin of the smell was the decomposing body of Jon(John Wanser), who was killed by Poque in Version 2.

In the Dungeon Rocko is plating Assassin's Creed, after he wakes he finds that Derek is looking in on Poque arguing with Horatio about Jon's body, they both decide to get rid of it ASAP, however when they take it outside Sean Lagerton and another man(Eric Badour) are taking pictures, when confronted by Poque, they explain that they are looking for a wizard so that they can get a wish and tell him that they are not moving until they see a wizard.

Back in the Dungeon, Sean is in a dark secluded room at a computer terminal, he is searching for the address of FALZ HQ, but cannot get the information as it requires a password, elsewhere Rocko and Derek decide to go back to the mysterious realm they visited in Bigger Boat, however they notice that the video uplink to Poques room is now outside with Sean Lagerton and the other wizard seeker, Poque runs by quickly and explains that they will be the entertainment/distraction for the wizard seekers and that Rocko and Derek are to take suggestions as to what experiments they'll do next from them, Poque leaves.
Rocko and Derek take the opportunity to try and escape, they explain that they are under the two wizard seekers and have been held captive for two years, Sean Legarton is unenthusiastic to help and asks what he'll get out of it, Rocko asks what he wants, the wizard seekers argue about a Halo skit vs a Counter Strike skit, but they settle on a God of War skit.

It has been a long running gag in the Mega 64 Podcast and various interviews that the skit suggestions that are given by fans are terrible and in order to lower the amount of skit suggestions the crew received on email they set up a Skit Suggestion forum on their site, it is flooded with terrible skit ideas from fans, so all skits mentioned by the wizard seekers in this episode are exactly how there were suggested to the Mega 64 crew by the fans.

After the God of War skit, Sean Legarton complains that it sucks and suggests an equally bad Sneak King skit, then a Ninja Turtles skit, after Rocko and Derek disconnect they ask for rescue, the seekers decline as the skit they suggested were not funny and walk away from the video uplink.
With the seekers gone Rocko and Derek decide to go back to the mysterious realm from Bigger Boat, they appear in a forest and spot a man with dreadlocks and sunglasses who flees upon spotting them, they quickly follow him, Rocko is held at knife point by the man who accuses them of trying to take her back, Derek explains that they have no idea what is going on, the man takes them to see the guild leader.

In Poque's room, Poque asks Horatio why there are people outside asking for a wizard, Horatio explains that him and Marcus are filming a sequel to The Wizard entitled The Wizard 2, Horatio promises that in 2 hours the street would be clear, however 2 hours later a full mob of wizard seekers have taken over the street, bringing cameras and gifts of salt, the mob is subject to a U62 news report which includes a wizard expert in the form of Preacher Z (Garrett Hunter) and a shrine that has been built by Hairy Garry the Feral Child (Tommy Tallarico)

Meanwhile, Rocko and Derek meet the Guild Leader (Luke Chatfield) asks them why they sought him out and if they came here for her, both Rocko and Derek still have no idea whats going on, they explain about the code that brought them there and about the cloaked man they met last time they entered the code, the Guild Leader explains that they had spoken to a Messenger and that the world they were in was a game, the man with dreadlocks takes them into the back room and shows them a girl (Laura Loza), the Guild Leader tells them that the game is called The Blacks.

The power to the Mega 64 is cut again, the video uplink that's outside is now filled with the mob, demanding to see a wizard, Derek ask why he wants to see a wizard, Sean Lagerton explains that his little brother has Scoliosis and that he wants the wizard to cure it, he then asks for a Counter Strike skit again and then they do a Track & Field skit, a Halo/Frogger hybrid skit, a Star Wars skit and a Scarface skit, Sean Lagerton and the mob still demand to see a wizard before they rescue Derek and Rocko who get frustrated and tell the mob that there is no such thing as wizards, the mob turns angry and Sean Lagerton smashes Poque's car with his signature tire
iron.

Back in Poque's room, Horatio remembers the call from FALZ and tells Poque, afterwards the FALZ Agent calls back and demands to talk to Jon, Poque puts him on hold, Marcus tells Poque that he'll take care of everything.
The FALZ Agent is taken off hold, Marcus is puppeteering Jon's corpse and manages to fool the FALZ Agent and Horatio has come up with a way to get rid of the body.
Meanwhile, at the computer terminal, Sean is asleep however the terminal starts to beep with an alert tone, he has received a message containing FALZ's address.

Outside, Horatio has dressed Jon's body up as a Wizard and has rigged it up with a loud speaker and strings to puppet it, the mob are stunned to silence, Horatio as The Wizard explains that there is magic inside us all and that he will perform one final act of magic called The Great Goodbye, Horatio  then uses explosives, sending pieces of Jon's body all over the ecstasy stricken mob.
As Poque is thanking Horatio, a real Wizard(Derrick Acosta) appears thanking them for helping him get rid of the mob and grants them one wish, Dr Poque uses it to bring back the one girl he loved, Sue, The Wizard grants it and disappears.

Mega64! (Musical episode)
This episode opens up with Dr Poque showing the FALZ Agent the PaRappa the Rapper skit, The Agent is curious about Jon's whereabouts but buys the excuse Poque gives as the Agent needs to talk mainly to Poque, he explains that there is a monetary problem with Poque's set up and that he needs to raise $10,000 in 7 days or else the project will be terminated.
Poque sings about how he's dead if he doesn't make the money for FALZ, in the dungeon Rocko and Derek sing about their tedious life and how they hope to be rescued and in Horatio's room, he sings about helping out Dr Poque and goes online to find a way to make money fast.

Back in Poque's room, Horatio tells Poque that there is a local talent show where the prize is $10,050, Poque bursts into song about how convenient it is that the prize money is $10,000 and ponders how he's going to win the show, he decides to put on a play about the Mega 64, which will win the show and create awareness of the Mega 64 system, after the song Horatio says that he'll help Poque by using Horatio's Acting Troop(HAT), Poque asks Rocko and Derek to audition.

However Marcus sings of a plan to sabotage the play, because when the gang moved into the apartment Poque asked Marcus to sign the lease, and if FALZ destroy the apartment Marcus would get all the insurance money.
Rocco and Derek audition in the form of a Singstar skit, Poque and Horatio are not impressed with their singing skills and ask what else they can do, after Derek and Rocco sing of their other talents Sean reveals that he grind a rail with soap shoes, Poque and Horatio are impressed by his talent and put him as the finale of the show, Sean then sings about how this is the greatest moment of his life with a song called Handful of the Sky.

Horatio assembles his acting troop and sings a song to warm up all of the performers, afterward Horatio is approached by an admirer(Geoff The Hero) who is then cut for wearing baby blue.
Dr Poque brings Sean along to the HAT practice, Sean then briefly talks to a fellow performer and then eats a muffin set aside just for him, but as he bites into it, he walks outside and pulls a razor blade from his bloody mouth, he is then clubbed and knocked out by Marcus.
Sean wakes up strapped to a table in an empty room, where Marcus accuses Sean of trying to ruin his plan of sabotaging the show and he explains the origin of the term break a leg, he then puts a block of wood in between Sean's legs and as Sean is begging for mercy, Marcus breaks both his legs with a sledgehammer. This, of course, is a parody of Stephen King's Misery.

The day of the talent show arrives and Horatio has no show as his acting troop has all left with the exception of Rocko and Derek, who he cuts, Horatio's admirer is the only person willing to work with him, however Horatio tells him that he hates him and that he never wants him.
Marcus is perched in the back of the theater armed with a sniper rifle and Dr Poque is in the front row along with his laptop which is uplinked to the FALZ Agent.
As Horatio's turn to go on stage come around, he rolls out a television which shows the Elite Beat Agents skit, afterward Horatio comes onstage and rants about how his troop left him and how he doesn't know where Marcus is and how he can't rely on Jon cos he was killed, The FALZ Agent hears this and cuts the connection with Poque's laptop, after his rant Horatio enters a bizarre song about how great he is but breaks his boom box.

Horatio then finishes by reprising the first song in the episode but this time he sings about his broken boom box, he is then joined by Rocko and Derek who did not know until now that Horatio was trying to save them, Marcus then enters the song singing about why Rocko and Derek are trying to save the play, finally Poque joins in and sings about how he's a dead man now that FALZ know what happened to Jon, but he appreciates Horatio's attempt to help, during the finale of the song, Horatio's admirer walks out on stage and is shot by Marcus who had only bought 1 bullet.

After $10,000 Reprise, Sean wheels himself out and attempts sings the chorus of Handful of the Sky, however he cannot sing as well as he did before due to his lip injury, after he's finished sing the theater bursts into a standing ovation and Horatio's Acting Troop win the contest.
In the lobby Poque tries to sell some Mega 64 systems, but is unsuccessful.

Project Whoosh
The episode begins with an unknown person in a hooded sweatshirt putting on music and getting on his bike. He leaves the garage on his bike and cruises down a long downhill sidewalk, before making a right curve into the street where he is hit head on by a car and slides across the pavement. Garrett quickly steps out of the car and shows concern to the man he ran over. The unknown person lifts up his head and assures that him he's going to be alright. He has red hair and a red mustache. It is Marcus. The rest of the episode details the back story of Marcus's past.

Marcus is a man who joins FALZ to earn money to buy the Eiffel Tower for the woman he loves and ends up losing his body to the Mega64 through multiple uses as a test subject. To hold his mind, the FALZ members use the puppet to house his conscience.

During the tales of Marcus's past, Pouqe has to deal with the newly risen Zombie Sue.

To kill Zombie Sue, Horatio sets out to find a gun to shoot her with. A gun he can not seem to remember where he put. Thus setting him off on a small adventure to find it.

Sean somehow ends up escaping the dungeon and travels to the abandoned warehouse of FALZ old headquarters to find answered to his past and strange visions. He finds a delusional man who, once seeing Sean, starts screaming, "It was you. It was you! You created the Mega64! You! YOU!" Sean is confused.

Horatio returns with the gun and kills Zombie Sue.

The episode is left to be continued.

Delaware
At FALZ HQ the Test subject is killed by a blind, cling-film–wielding assassin called Tony who attempts to kill Sean but after a struggle, an injured Sean escapes and Tony seems to be killed meanwhile The FALZ organization invade Dr Poque's apartment complex, Poque activates Twopoque who is quickly destroyed by the FALZ henchmen, Poque and Marcus are captured, Horatio escapes and Rocko and Derick are captured but kill their guard and split up, Rocko goes into Poque's room where he meets the head of FALZ, Garret.

Garret explains to a confused Rocko that FALZ are letting Dr Poque go and offers Rocko the chance to head up FALZ's latest project, elsewhere Derrick finds a FALZ recruitment tape for the DOWN community, which uses the Mega64 system to play 'the world's most elaborate game' The Blacks, which helps with another mysterious project known as Project W. 
Garret finds it tough to explain the concept of The Blacks to Rocko without the aid of the video Derrick found, he explains it as a world that exists outside reality in the users mind that they would never want to leave, he then explains that the Mega64 system is a box of magic and that when the box was put into a body, it became conscious and that the waves emitted cross peoples minds who then join FALZ, Garret describes FALZ as the immune system of the Mega64, Garret also explains the next step in FALZ's plan which is to harness the power of the specter who haunts the Mega64 using a mysterious Deathbox and that FALZ need to find Sean.

Poque is taken behind the Apartment building, where he is left with fellow prisoners Marcus and Trigger Serious who explains that he has been stalking Poque and sympathizes with him because of the way FALZ treat him and apologizes afterward the lead FALZ henchman gives Poque the change of redemption with FALZ by killing Trigger Serious, Poque doesn't do it saying that he doesn't blame him for anything and Trigger Serious does not blame Poque for the Mega 64's age limit bug killing his father(Brian Specter), the lead henchman explains that there is no age limit bug and that FALZ stabbed Brian to guilt Poque into joining FALZ, the henchman then kills Trigger Serious.

Back in Poque's room Rocko finds it hard to understand that Sean is the creator of the Mega64, Garret explains that the more times you use the Mega64, the more your mind slips away and that Sean had done more testing than all other subjects combined, Rocko then tells Garret that Sean was heading to FALZ HQ, Garret is shocked and tells Rocko that they kept the Mega64 at Poque's apartment to keep it hidden as they don't know where the Mega64 came from and that FALZ had been hiding from a group who claim it was theirs first, little is known about the group only that they consist of seven deadly assassins and that when one of them is killed, they sound an alarm to alert the other members, FALZ call them The Killers. While Rocko is looking through Garret's file on The Killers he notices that Lobo Fuerte was one of them.

Meanwhile, after suffering severe injuries from his fight with Tony, Sean collapses and is taken into the Mega64 universe where he meets The Specter who tells Sean to destroy FALZ and gives him a sword and a pair of golden soap shoes, Sean wakes up in the real world without injuries and grinds the soaps back to the apartment.
Garret assembles all the FALZ higher ups behind the apartment, Derrick tries to rescue Rocko but fails and gets captured, Horatio attempts to rescue the gang but is pegged by a rock, Sean Legerton also attempts a rescue but is shot in the back.

Elsewhere a stunned Sean encounters Tony which causes him to have a flashback to a conversation between himself and Rick. Garret is banging on the door demanding to speak to the creator of the Mega64, Sean tells Rick not to go and that he will take credit for the Mega64 and save Rick from the hands of FALZ, but Rick is determined to go and tells Sean that is anything goes wrong he'll send an encrypted message that can be unlocked by the password Delaware. Sean knocks Tony out and goes with FALZ. Back in the present Sean destroys Tony and continues back to the apartment, after Sean has left Tony's body, an alarm sounds, Tony was one of The Killers.

At the apartment Sean arrives, Garret unloads on him but Sean teleports to dodge all the bullets, as Garret reloads, Sean runs at him with the sword, as he is about to kill Garret the Deathbox sounds, Sean has lost his sword, soaps and his injuries have returned, Garret shoots and kills Sean, he then goes to execute Rocko and Derek, as he about to pull the trigger, his radio goes of, one of the Henchmen(Dan Paladin) says he's found Sean in the attic of the Apartment, a confused Garret asks the henchman to describe Sean, the henchman is killed after doing so, an irate Garret screams 'Where Is He?', and from behind he hears the answer, 'Here', Garret turns around and puts a bullet in the mysterious figure, he and all of FALZ unload on Sombrero Guy, he survives and wipes out all of FALZ except Garret, Sombrero Guy leaves Garret's fate in the hands of Dr Poque, Garret stalls Poque long enough to retrieve his pistol and as Poque pulls the trigger, Garret takes aim and fires.
Garret is killed instantly, Poque is in a critical condition, the Sombrero Guy walks over to Sean's corpse and revives him with an Indian chant, after which Sombrero Guy leaves Earth.

Horatio, Rocko, Derek, Marcus and Sean are all gathered around Poque. Horatio asks him why he didn't ask for Sombrero Guy's help, to which he responds that, 'it couldn't last. it was just too much fun' and passes away.

One month later, a young girl is flicking through TV channels, her TV then picks up the pirate signal of Horatio TV, with FALZ gone, Horatio has taken over the Mega64 Project, saying that he's doing the project out of love, just like the man who did it before him, Horatio proclaims that 'This is the new Mega64!'

References

Lists of American non-fiction television series episodes